A scenario is a synopsis of a series of actions and events in a work of the performing arts that lacks a full script, such as a ballet.

Scenario or scenarios may also refer to:
 Scenario planning, a strategic planning method from future studies
 Scenario (computing), the interaction between a computer user and a computer system or between two software components
 Scenario optimization, is a technique for obtaining solutions to problems based on randomization of the constraints
 User scenario, used to communicate an idea for a product or experience involving interactivity
 Scenario in films, part of the screenwriting process, precursor to a screenplay
 Scenario – A Journal for Drama and Theatre Pedagogy, a bilingual online journal
 Scenario (album), a 1983 album by Al Di Meola
 Scenarios (album), by Andy Milne and Grégoire Maret
 Scenario (song), a 1992 song by hip-hop group, A Tribe Called Quest
 Scenario (artwork), an artificially intelligent interactive cinema project